Bagasan Assigi Graham (born 6 October 1992 in Plaistow, London Borough of Newham, England) is an English footballer who plays for Sittingbourne.

Career
Graham progressed through the Queens Park Rangers youth ranks. He made the switch to Football League Two side Cheltenham Town on a two-year contract. He made his professional debut on 16 August 2011, in the Football League Two 2–1 defeat to Morecambe at Whaddon Road. He came on as a second-half substitute for Josh Low.

He joined AFC Telford United on loan in February 2013 for an initial month-long period. It was announced that Graham would stay at Telford until the end of the season. On 17 May 2013 his contract expired. Graham then moved onto Chelmsford City in August 2013.

After one season with Chelmsford City, making 24 appearances in all competitions, he joined Dulwich Hamlet of the Isthmian League Premier Division in August 2014, with the signing being funded by the Dulwich Hamlet 12th Man scheme, scoring on his debut against Billericay Town.

Graham re-joined Chelmsford City and went on to have a successful season, making 43 appearances in all competitions and going on to score three goals and getting six assists. After the season finished he picked up the 'Young Player of The Year' award. Manager Rod Stringer announced he would be signing a new one-year contract for the 2016–17 season. Graham picked up his first goal of the season against Ebbsfleet United also picking up the Man of the match award.

Graham signed for Ebbsfleet United on 26 June 2017 after impressing in the play-off final against the club. On 29 November 2017, Graham returned to Chelmsford City on an initial one-month loan deal. On 1 January 2018, Chelmsford City extended Graham's loan deal until the end of the season. On 6 June 2019, he signed for National League side Dagenham & Redbridge on a one-year deal. In September 2020, Graham signed for Isthmian League North Division club Romford.

On 8 June 2021, Graham signed for Dartford ahead of the 2021-22 National League South season.

On 24 September 2021, Graham signed for Billericay Town.

On 12 June 2022, Graham joined Sittingbourne.

Career statistics

Honours
Billericay Town
Essex Senior Cup: 2021–22

References

External links

1992 births
Footballers from Plaistow, Newham
Living people
English footballers
Association football midfielders
Queens Park Rangers F.C. players
Boreham Wood F.C. players
Cheltenham Town F.C. players
Gloucester City A.F.C. players
AFC Telford United players
Chelmsford City F.C. players
Dulwich Hamlet F.C. players
Ebbsfleet United F.C. players
Dagenham & Redbridge F.C. players
Romford F.C. players
Dartford F.C. players
Billericay Town F.C. players
Sittingbourne F.C. players
English Football League players
National League (English football) players
Isthmian League players
Black British sportspeople